A Chance Deception is a 1913 American drama film directed by  D. W. Griffith and starring Blanche Sweet.

Cast
 Blanche Sweet as The Wife
 Charles Hill Mailes as The Jealous Husband
 Harry Carey as Raffles
 Mildred Manning as Raffles' Woman
 John T. Dillon as The Waiter
 Lionel Barrymore as A Policeman
 Dorothy Bernard as The Maid (unconfirmed)
 Christy Cabanne as Undetermined Role
 Adolph Lestina as A Visitor
 Wilfred Lucas as In Restaurant (unconfirmed)
 Joseph McDermott as A Policeman

See also
 List of American films of 1913
 Harry Carey filmography
 D. W. Griffith filmography
 Blanche Sweet filmography
 Lionel Barrymore filmography

References

External links

1913 films
Films directed by D. W. Griffith
American silent short films
Biograph Company films
American black-and-white films
1913 drama films
1913 short films
Silent American drama films
1910s American films